Stephanie Anne Cooke is an Australian politician. Cooke has served as the Minister for Emergency Services and Resilience in the Perrottet ministry since December 2021. During the New South Wales floods in February to March 2022, Cooke was additionally appointed Minister for Flood Recovery to oversee the flood recovery. She has been a Nationals member of the New South Wales Legislative Assembly since 14 October 2017, representing Cootamundra since a by-election held to replace Katrina Hodgkinson.

Cooke was a florist before entering politics and ran a business, Native Botanical, with outlets in Cootamundra, Temora and Young. In 2017 her business was recognised as NSW Florist of the Year.

References

 

Year of birth missing (living people)
Living people
Members of the New South Wales Legislative Assembly
National Party of Australia members of the Parliament of New South Wales
Women members of the New South Wales Legislative Assembly
Florists
21st-century Australian politicians
21st-century Australian women politicians